This page is a list of places of interest in Bursa Province, Turkey.

Fortresses and City Walls
 Bursa Kalesi (Fortress)
 İznik Kalesi (Fortress)
 Kestel Kalesi (Fortress)
 Kite Kalesi (Fortress)
 Yer Kapı (Gate)
 Pınarbaşı Kapısı (Gate)
 Zindan Kapı (Gate)
 Kaplıcalar Kapısı (Gate)
 İstanbul Kapısı (Gate)
 Lefke Kapısı (Gate)
 Yenişehir Kapısı (Gate)

Mosques
 Abdal Camii
 Ahmet Dai Camii
 Ahmet Paşa Fenari Camii
 Alaaddin Camii
 Ali Paşa Camii
 Ali Paşa Camii (Gemlik)
 Altıparmak Camii
 Araplar Camii
 Arap Mehmed Camii
 Ayasofya Camii (İznik)
 Ayaz Köyü Camii (Mustafakemalpaşa)
 Aynalı Camii
 Baba Sultan Camii (Gürsu)
 Balıkpazari Camii (Gemlik)
 Başçı İbrahim Camii
 Beyazit Paşa Camii
 Bedrettin (Hafsa Sultan) Camii
 Beşikçiler Camii
 Cumalıkızık Camii
 Daye Hatun (Taya Kadın) Camii
 Demirtaş (Timurtaş) Camii
 Duhtter-i Şerif (Fışkırık) Camii
 Emir Sultan Mosque 
 Ertuğrul Camii
 Eski Camii (Karacabey)
 Eşrefzade Camii (İznik)
 Fatih Camii (Mudanya)
 Gençali Köyü Camii (Gemlik)
 Hacı Ali Paşa Camii (Gemlik)
 Hacılar Camii
 Halilağa Camii (Mudanya)
 Hamzabey Camii
 Hasanbey Camii (Mudanya)
 İbni Bezzaz Camii
 İbrahim Paşa Camii
 İvaz Paşa Camii
 Kavaklı Camii
 Kayan Camii
 Kiremitçi Camii
 Kurşunlu Camii (Karacabey)
 Mahmut Çelebi Camii (İznik)
 Molla Fenari Camii
 Muradiye Camii
 Namazgah Camii
 Nalbantoğlu Camii
 Umur Bey Camii
 Orhan Bey Camii
 Orhan Gazi Camii (Yenişehir)
 Piremir Camii
 Selimiye Camii
 Selimzade Camii
 Setbaşı(Karaçelebi) Camii
 Somuncu Baba (Şeyh Hamid) (Ayazma) Camii
 Şehadet(Saray) Camii
 Şekerhoca Camii
 Şerefüddin Paşa Camii
 Şeyh Müftü Camii (Mustafakemalpaşa)
 Şible(Şibli) Camii
 Teke-i Atik Camii (Mudanya)
 Tuzpazarı Camii
 Ulucami(Cami Kebir)
 Ulucami(Karacabey)
 Üç Kuzular Camii
 Üftade Camii
 Veled-i Veziri Camii
 Yerkapı (Bab-i Zemin) (Kara Ali) Camii
 Yeşil Mosque 
 Yeşil Cami (İznik)
 Bayezid I Mosque and complex (külliye) - Yıldırım Camii ve külliyesi-
 Yiğit Cedid Camii
 Yiğit Köhne Camii

Small Mosques (Mesjids)
 Acem Reis (Arab Dede) Mescidi
 Akbiyik (Veled-İ Harir) Mescidi
 Alacahirka Mescidi
 Alanyeri (İsmail Hakki) Mescidi
 Azeb Bey Mescidi
 Çakirağa (Mecnun Dede) Mescidi
 Çukur Mahalle Mescidi
 Davut Paşa Mescidi
 Ebu İshak Mescidi
 Güngörmez Mescidi
 Haci Mehmed Ağa Mescidi (Mudanya)
 Haci Özbek Mescidi (İznik)
 Haci Sevinç Mescidi
 Haci Seyfettin (Seyfuddin) Mescidi
 İmaret-İ İsabey Mescidi
 Reyhan (Acemler) Mescidi
 Selçuk Hatun Mescidi
 Tahtali Mescid
 Veled-İ Yaniç Mescidi
 Yeni Kaplica Mescidi

Churches
 Ayasofya Church (İznik)
 Aydınpınar Köyü Church (Mudanya)
 Çamlıca Köyü Church (Karacabey)
 Çatalağıl Church (Demirtaş)
 Dereköy Church (Mudanya)
 Eski Karaağaç Köyü Church (Karacabey)
 Fransız Protestan Kilise (Bursa)
 H.Georgios Church (Gölyazı)
 Harmanlı Köyü Church (Karacabey)
 İznik Church (İznik)
 Zoimesis Tes Theotokos Church  (İznik)
 Aziz Tryphonos Church (İznik)
 Karakoca Köyü Church (Karacabey)
 Koimesis Tes Theotokos Church (Demirtaş)
 H.Konstantinos Church (Gölyazı)
 Kumyaka Church (Mudanya)
 Michael Taxiarches Church (Demirtaş)
 Mudanya Church (Mudanya)
 Theodoros Church (Çalı)

Tombs (Türbes)
 Abdüllatif Kutsi Türbesi
 Ahmed Paşa Türbesi
 Akbiyik Türbesi
 Azeb Bey Türbesi
 Çobanbey Türbesi
 Ebu İshak Türbesi
 Emir Sultan Türbesi
 Gazi Timurtaş Türbesi
 Halil Hayreddin Ve Ali Paşa Türbesi (İznik)
 Hamzabey Türbesi
 Hatice Sultan Türbesi
 Hatuniye Türbesi
 İbrahim Paşa Türbesi (İznik)
 Kara Mustafa Paşa Türbesi
 Kirgizlar Türbesi (İznik)
 Mükrime Hatun Türbesi
 Okçu Baba Türbesi
 Omur (Umur) Bey Türbesi
 Orhan Gazi Türbesi
 Osmangazi Türbesi
 Sarı Saltuk Türbesi (İznik)
 Süleyman Çelebi Türbesi
 Şahin (Şahan) Baba Türbesi (Keles)
 Şehzade Mahmut Türbesi
 Şehzade Mustafa (Mustafa-İ Cedid) Türbesi
 Şehzade Mustafa (Ahmet) (Cem Sultan) Türbesi
 Şirin Hatun Türbesi
 Üç Kuzular Türbesi
 Yakup Çelebi Türbesi (İznik)
 Yeşil (Çelebi Sultan Mehmet) Türbesi
 Yildirim Bayezid Türbesi

Madrasas
 Lala Şahin Paşa (Hisar) Madrasa
 Muradiye Madrasa
 Süleyman Paşa Madrasa (İznik)
 Vaiziye (Mahkeme) Madrasa
 Yeşil (Sultan) Madrasa

Museums
 Tofaş Museum of Cars and Anatolian Carriages
 Hünkar Köşkü Museum
 Uluumay Ottoman Folk Clothing and Jewelry Museum
 Bursa City Museum
 Bursa Archaeological Museum
 Bursa Energy Museum
 Bursa Forestry Museum
 Bursa Museum of Turkish and Islamic Art
Museum of Ottoman House
 Bursa Atatürk Museum
 Hüsnü Züber Evi / Yaşayan (Living) Museum

Hammams (Turkish Baths)
 Aksu Köyü Hammam 
 Baba Sultan Hammam (Gürsu)
 Cikcik (Gir Çik) Hammam
 Çekirge Hammam
 Davut Paşa (Bat Bazaar) Hammam
 Demirtaş (Timurtaş) Hammam
 Emir Sultan Hammam
 Eski Yeni (Ördekli) Hammam
 Eyne Bey Hammam
 Haci Hamza Hammam (İznik)
 Hançerli Hammam
 Haydarhane Hammam
 Horhor Hammam
 İncirli Hammam
 Büyük Hammam (İznik)
 Kayan (Kaygan) Hammam
 Keçeli Hammam
 Mahkeme (İbrahim Paşa) Hammam
 Muradiye Hammam
 Nalincilar (Tahil) Hammam
 Nasuh Paşa Hammam
 Omur (Umur) Bey Hammam
 Orhanbey Hammam
 Orhangazi Hammam
 Orhangazi Hammam (İznik)
 Perşembe (Kadi / Hamam-İ Atik) Hammam
 Reyhan Hammam
 Servinaz Hammam
 Şengül Hammam
 Tahir Ağa Hammam (Mudanya)
 Tavuk Pazari Hammam
 Yahudiler Hammam
 Yakup Bey Hammam (Keles)
 Yeşil Hammam
 Yıldırım Hammam

Caravanserais (Hans)
 Balı Bey Caravanserai 
 Emir Caravanserai
 Eski Yeni Caravanserai
 Hoca Dursun Caravanserai (Gürsu)
 Geyve (Hacı İvaz-Payigah) Caravanserai
 İpek Caravanserai
 Koza Caravanserai
 Pirinç Caravanserai
 Tuz Caravanserai
 Fidan Caravanserai

Bridges
 Abdal Bridge
 Cılımboz Bridge
 Demirtaş Bridge
 Irgandı Bridge
 Meydancık (Geredeli) Bridge
 Setbaşı Bridge
 Tatarlar Bridge

Hotsprings
 Vakifbahçe (Çekirge) Hotspring
 Bademli Bahçe Hotspring
 Dümbüldek Hotspring
 Gemlik (Terme) Hotspring
 Armutlu Hotspring
 Oylat Hotspring
 Ağaçhisar Hotspring
 Sadağ Hotspring
 Çitli Maden Mineral Water Spring
 Mineviz Mineral Water Spring
 Akarca Mineral Water Spring

References

Tourist attractions in Bursa